The Sarasota County Library System is the public library system that serves Sarasota County in the U.S. state of Florida. It consists of 10 locations, including a central library located in the city of Sarasota.

History 
The Sarasota Town Improvement Society established its first library in 1907. Over the years the system increased in size, and today there are ten library branches associated with Sarasota County Public Library System.

Every library provides patrons with adult, teen, and children's materials, along with computers for public use and Wi-Fi access. Sarasota County residents have access to Book-By-Mail, a convenient and free service to send library materials through the U.S. Postal Service to people who are unable to access the library collection due to temporary or long-term physical or visual disability, and Pinellas Talking Book Library. Through the latter, "residents of all ages who are unable to read standard print material due to visual, physical, or learning disabilities are provided recorded, Braille, and large-print books and magazines as well as a collection of descriptive videos and Playaways."

Sarasota County library patrons also have access to interlibrary loans (ILL), which allows patrons to borrow items from other library systems in Florida when the Sarasota County libraries do not own the material. They participate in the Florida Library Information Network (FLIN) to borrow materials from other participating Florida libraries through the SHAREit service. Sarasota County residents with a library card in good standing can request interlibrary loans. Individuals who purchase a visitor card (aka "non-resident card") will also have access to ILL if their cards are in good standing. Library accounts must have fines below $10 and the card cannot be expired.

The Sarasota County Library System has a range of materials chosen based on the Collection Development Policy. These materials are selected by librarians using professional review sources. The system also takes recommendations from patrons.

In 2012, Sarasota was named "Florida Library of the Year" by the Florida Library Association.

Branches

Elsie Quirk Library

The Elsie Quirk Library was established on June 15, 1962. The  library was established by Elsie Quirk after she visited a small community library while on vacation in North Carolina in 1961. When Quirk returned from vacation, she donated land at 101 Cocoanut Avenue in Englewood, along with $10,000.

The Friends of the Library was established in 1961, headed by Leah Lasbury, Josephine Cortez and President Lois Potter. The Lemon Bay Women's Club donated 3600 books to the Elsie Quirk Library. It was manned by many volunteers, including Quirk herself.

This library became a major part of the Englewood Community. In 2001 it was upgraded and has become the Elsie Quirk Public Library.

Frances T. Bourne Jacaranda Library
The Jacaranda Library was established on January 25, 1994, in Venice. In 1995, it changed its name to the Frances T. Bourne Jacaranda Library, dedicated to the former archivist in the U.S. State Department who helped raise funds to create the library.

In 2004, the library received an addition to the building that doubled its size. The architect who designed the addition aimed to incorporate the natural world with the building by emphasizing the buildings natural surroundings (the campus features a pond filled with lilies and is adjacent to a walking trail). The interior walls also feature many murals and paintings that reflect the Florida environment.

Fruitville Library
The Fruitville Public Library was established in 2001 and serves Sarasota County and Lakewood Ranch residents. In 2003, a reading garden was opened to the public, along with a bookstore. The bookstore is run by the Friends of the Fruitville Public Library.

Gulf Gate Library

The Gulf Gate Library opened in 1977, originally located in a storefront on Gateway Avenue. On December 5, 1983, the library opened its doors.

After much wear and tear over the years, the Friends of the Gulf Gate Library raised funds to build a new library. The library shut down in 2013 and temporarily relocated for two years to the Sarasota Square Mall.

The new library re-opened to the public on January 24, 2015, at its original location. Upon its re-opening, the library received Reader's Digests "Most Impressive" award for the state of Florida in their "The Most Impressive Library in Every State" article. In 2016, the library was nominated as "the most beautiful library in Florida" by Tech Insider.

North Port Library
In 1975, funds were raised to purchase a two-bedroom house was purchased on Tamiami Trail, which was enlarged to serve as a library. It was a free library, staffed only by volunteers, and operating with 5,000 donated books. In 1992, the library outgrew the house and a new library building was built. The library now has a used book store.

Shannon Staub Library
The Shannon Staub Library opened on October 17, 2017. The 23,321-square-foot facility serves as both a public library and the library for the technical college. The namesake of the library, Shannon Staub, became a champion for libraries and even though she is now retired, she stays very active within the Sarasota County Public Library System. Staub was a 14-year Sarasota County commissioner who represented North Port, Englewood, and Venice. She was a significant proponent for public libraries, becoming a founding chair of the Library Foundation of Sarasota County in 2012.

Betty J. Johnson North Sarasota Library
The North Sarasota Library once offered a program that allows patrons to check out a person, just like checking out a library book. Through this program, local community members sit and talk with patrons for 20 minutes. In 2019 the North Sarasota Library was renamed as the Betty J. Johnson North Sarasota Library in honor of a county employee who had worked for the library system for over four decades. Betty Johnson was an advocate for youth literacy and in 1979 had, along with the help of a not-for-profit library organization (the Friends of the Library), secured a grant of $10,000 to start a mobile library that eventually grew to become the North Sarasota Library in 2003.

Osprey Library at Historic Spanish Point
This small library is located inside the main building at Historic Spanish Point in Osprey, which also used to be the Osprey School. With an archaeological record that encompasses approximately 5,000 years of Florida prehistory, this National Register of Historic Places living history museum is referred to as one of the largest intact actively preserved archaeological sites of the prehistoric period on the Gulf Coast of Florida.

Selby Library

The Selby Library was established in 1907, as the first library built in Sarasota County. It remains the county's largest. Started in 1907 using a small donation from the Sarasota Town Improvement Society, it began as a single room housing books mostly donated by John Hamilton Gillespie, Sarasota's first mayor. It was located in the Stone Block Building on the southwest corner of Main Street and Pineapple Avenue.

In 1913, the Women's Club assumed operations. The library was moved to the club's headquarters, today the site of Florida Studio Theatre, where it remained from 1915 to 1931. The Sarasota County School Board then donated a wing of a school building on Main Street when more space was needed to accommodate the library's growing collections. In 1940, the city assumed control of the library, and one year later moved it to the Chidsey Library on Tamiami Trail.

In 1976, a new library was built on the bayfront and named the Selby Library in honor of the William G. and Marie Selby Foundation, whose donated funds made the new library possible. This permanent endowment was established by William Selby before his death in 1956.

The library moved from its bay front location to its new downtown location at Five Points Park in 1998, keeping its Selby name.

William H. Jervey Jr. Venice Library
The Venice Library was built in 1965. In 2012, mold was discovered in one of the library's meeting rooms in which the county underwent efforts to clean the building. However, the problem persisted, and in 2014 mold returned to the meeting room. As a result, county officials closed down the meeting room as mold continued to spread throughout the library.

In spring 2017, the original Venice Library was demolished and construction began in the fall for a new library. The William H. Jervey Jr. Venice Public Library opened on December 15, 2018.

The building is named after William H. Jervey, Jr. who donated $1 million towards the project. He was initially critical of the closing of the original library. Jervey also donated $250,000 as an estate gift to the entire Sarasota Public Library System.

References 

Public libraries in Florida